The following is a list of high school athletic conferences in Wisconsin. All of the following are overseen by the Wisconsin Interscholastic Athletic Association (WIAA). The listed district for each conference is designated by WIAA, who divided the state into seven portions: District 1 is Northwest, District 2 is Northeast, District 3 is West Central, District 4 is East Central, District 5 is Southwest, District 6 is South Central, and District 7 is Southeast. The divisions column denotes the division(s) the conference uses for basketball.

Conferences

References

High school athletic conferences
High school athletic conferences